The 1906 college baseball season, play of college baseball in the United States began in the spring of 1906.  Play largely consisted of regional matchups, some organized by conferences, and ended in June.  No national championship event was held until 1947.

New programs
St. John's played its first varsity season.

Conference winners
This is a partial list of conference champions from the 1906 season.

Award winners

All-Southern team

References